Auchenoglanis is a genus of relatively large, up to  SL, claroteid catfishes native to various freshwater habitats in Africa.

Auchenoglanis is a primitive member of the subfamily Auchenoglanidinae (also includes Notoglanidium and Parauchenoglanis) and represents a stem group.

Species of this genus occur predominantly in the Nilo-Sudan region and Western Africa, but also in the Congo River, Lakes Albert and Tanganyika.

Auchenoglanis species mainly feed on insect aquatic larvae and eventually on small mollusks, alevin, and swimming insects. These feeding habits should also enable them to stand a relatively wide range of ecological conditions.

Living species 
Following a taxonomic review in 1991, only two living species (marked with a star* in the list) were recognized in this genus. This is followed by FishBase. A review in 2010 found that there are six additional species, bringing the total to eight, and this is followed by Catalog of Fishes. Genetic studies indicate that additional, currently unrecognized species exist.

 Auchenoglanis acuticeps Pappenheim, 1914
 Auchenoglanis biscutatus* (É. Geoffroy Saint-Hilaire, 1809)
 Auchenoglanis occidentalis* (Valenciennes, 1840) (Bubu)
 Auchenoglanis sacchii (Vinciguerra, 1898)
 Auchenoglanis senegali Retzer, 2010
 Auchenoglanis tanganicanus Boulenger, 1906
 Auchenoglanis tchadiensis Pellegrin, 1909
 Auchenoglanis wittei Giltay, 1930

Fossil species
Auchenoglanis is rare in the fossil record compared to other African catfishes. Auchenoglanis includes an extinct species, Auchenoglanis soye from Western Chad. A few other fossils are also attributed to Auchenoglanis with no specific species described.

References

Claroteidae
Fish of Africa
Catfish genera
Freshwater fish genera
Taxa named by Albert Günther